Paul Johnson (born 13 March 1988) is an English professional rugby league footballer. He previously played for the Widnes Vikings in the Super League. He has international honours at amateur level, having featured for Great Britain Community Lions. He was only recently promoted to the first team from the reserves (in doing so was awarded the No. 32 jersey), so he has yet to make a first team appearance. He was named in his first 19-man squad ahead of the derby with Wigan Warriors on Friday 31 July 2009. He also made the 19 for the 21 August 2009 game against the Huddersfield Giants but again dropped out.

Début season (2010)
Johnson made his first grade début for St Helens in 2010's Super League XV, coming off the bench to play  in a 30–22 win at home to the Huddersfield Giants.

Move to Wakefield Trinity Wildcats
It was announced that Johnson's first year with Saints would be his last, as he secured a two-year contract at Wakefield Trinity Wildcats. He has been allocated the shirt number 17. Johnson made his début in the Festive Trophy on New Years Day, when Wakefield Trinity Wildcats lost 22–40 to Leeds Rhinos. He was awarded the Man of The Match Award in this game, for his excellent contribution going forward.

Widnes Vikings
On 7 October 2013, it was announced that Johnson would be signing for the Widnes Vikings on a one-year contract after securing an early release from Hull FC. On 22 April 2014, Johnson extended his Widnes contract to the end of 2016. On 11 February 2015 Johnson and fellow Vikings teammate Grant Gore was loaned to Whitehaven on a one-month deal.

References

External links
Saints Heritage Society profile

1988 births
Living people
English rugby league players
Hull F.C. players
Rugby league centres
Rugby league players from St Helens, Merseyside
Rugby league second-rows
St Helens R.F.C. players
Wakefield Trinity players
Whitehaven R.L.F.C. players
Widnes Vikings players